The 1965–66 1re série season was the 45th season of the 1re série, the top level of ice hockey in France. Chamonix Hockey Club won their 22nd league title.

Final ranking
 1st place: Chamonix Hockey Club
 2nd place: Athletic Club de Boulogne-Billancourt
 3rd place: CSG Grenoble
 4th place: Sporting Hockey Club Saint Gervais
 5th place: Ours de Villard-de-Lans
 6th place: Gap Hockey Club
 7th place: Français Volants
 8th place: Lille
 9th place: US Métro
 10th place: ?
 11th place: ?
 12th place: Diables Rouges de Briançon
 13th place: ?
 14th place: Grenoble UNI
 15th place: ?
 16th place: Pralognan-la-Vanoise
 17th place: ASPP Paris

External links
List of French champions on hockeyarchives.info

France
1965–66 in French ice hockey
Ligue Magnus seasons